Hubert Stefan Pala (4 September 1933 – 5 September 2007) was a Polish former footballer who competed in the 1960 Summer Olympics.

References

External links 
 

1933 births
2007 deaths
Association football forwards
Polish footballers
Olympic footballers of Poland
Footballers at the 1960 Summer Olympics
Ruch Chorzów players
Sportspeople from Chorzów
Poland international footballers